

Rankings

^Final Poll = ESPN/USA Today Coaches Poll

Awards

All-Conference Teams
All-SEC First Team

References